The Stokes mortar was a British trench mortar designed by Sir Wilfred Stokes KBE that was issued to the British and U.S. armies, as well as the Portuguese Expeditionary Corps, during the latter half of the First World War. The 3-inch trench mortar is a smooth-bore, muzzle-loading weapon for high angles of fire. Although it is called a 3-inch mortar, its bore is actually 3.2 inches or 81 mm.

Design

The Stokes mortar was a simple weapon, consisting of a smoothbore metal tube fixed to a base plate (to absorb recoil) with a lightweight bipod mount. When a mortar bomb was dropped into the tube, an impact sensitive primer in the base of the bomb would make contact with a firing pin at the base of the tube, and ignite the propellant charge in the base, launching the bomb towards the target. The warhead itself was detonated by an impact fuse on reaching the target. 

The barrel is a seamless drawn-steel tube necked down at the breech or base end. To the breech end is fitted a base cap, within which is secured a firing pin protruding into the barrel. The caps at each end of the bomb cylinder were 81 mm diameter. The bomb was fitted with a modified hand grenade fuse on the front, with a perforated tube containing a propellant charge and an impact-sensitive cap at the rear.

Range was determined by the amount of propellant charge used and the angle of the barrel. A basic propellant cartridge was used for all firing, and covered short ranges. Up to four additional "rings" of propellant were used for incrementally greater ranges. The four rings were supplied with the cartridge and gunners discarded the rings that were not needed.

One potential problem was the recoil, which was "exceptionally severe, because the barrel is only about 3 times the weight of the projectile, instead of about one hundred times the weight as in artillery. Unless the legs are properly set up they are liable to injury".

A modified version of the mortar, which fired a modern fin-stabilised streamlined projectile and had a booster charge for longer range, was developed after World War I; this was in effect a new weapon.

History 

Light mortars portable by one man had already been in use centuries earlier, but had fallen out of general usage since the Napoleonic era. With the many changes to battlefield doctrine during the First World War, the concept gained interest again. At first the British and French resorted to re-issuing these ancient mortars; after modernized designs became available, the Stokes mortar in particular gained popularity.

Frederick Wilfred Scott Stokes – who later became Sir Wilfred Stokes KBE – designed the mortar in January 1915. The British Army was at the time trying to develop a weapon that would be a match for the Imperial German Army's Minenwerfer mortar, which was in use on the Western Front.

Stokes's design was initially rejected in June 1915 because it was unable to use existing stocks of British mortar ammunition. It took the intervention of David Lloyd George (at that time Minister of Munitions) and Lieutenant-Colonel J. C. Matheson of the Trench Warfare Supply Department (who reported to Lloyd George) to expedite manufacture of the Stokes mortar.

In the last quarter of 1915, 304 Stokes mortars were produced. Only 104 of these reached the front, however, the remainder being sent to training schools. The subcontracting-out of manufacture of the mortar mounting was undertaken in February 1916. In March 1916, it was announced the light trench mortars would be controlled by Infantry Brigades. The handbook for the Stokes trench mortar was issued to the infantry in April 1916. In total, 11,331 3-inch Stokes mortars were manufactured in Britain.

It remained in service into the Second World War, when it was superseded by the Ordnance ML 3 inch mortar, and some remained in use by New Zealand forces until after the Second World War.

Stokes received a knighthood for inventing the modern mortar, and was given several forms of monetary reward by the Ministry of Munitions.

The French developed an improved version of the Stokes mortar as the Brandt Mle 27, further refined as the Brandt Mle 31; this design was widely copied with and without license. Despite their indigenous production, out of 8,000 81 mm mortars in service with the French in 1939, 2,000 were of the original Mk. I build purchased from Great Britain.

Combat use

In World War I, the Stokes mortar could fire as many as 25 bombs per minute and had a maximum range of  firing the original cylindrical un-stabilised projectile. British Empire units had 1,636 Stokes mortars in service on the Western Front at the Armistice. 

A  version was used to fire smoke, poison gas, and thermite (incendiary) rounds. A quantity of just under thirty were used at the Battle of Loos in September 1915. Up to the end of 1918, a total of 1,123 were manufactured. This, used solely by the Special Brigade of the Royal Engineers, should be considered a separate weapon from the standard "3-inch" version used by the infantry — with an actual bore of  — firing high explosive rounds described in this article. 

The Stokes mortar was used in the Banana Wars and helped American forces defeat Sandinista rebels during the Second Battle of Las Cruces on 1 January 1928. The Paraguayan Army made extensive use of the Stokes mortar during the Chaco War, especially as a siege weapon in the Battle of Boquerón in September 1932. Stokes mortars were widely used by the Republican Army during the Spanish Civil War, sold mostly by Poland. In September 1936, 44,000 Stokes rounds arrived in Spain.

Image gallery

See also
 Ordnance ML 3 inch mortar : British 1930s successor

Weapons of comparable role, performance and era
7.58 cm Minenwerfer : approximate German equivalent

Surviving examples
Australian War Memorial, Canberra
An example with bombs is displayed at l'hotel de ville d'Arras, France.Bernard Plumier : Link to his web page which has details and photograph Direct link to photograph

See also
Mortar (weapon)
List of infantry mortars

Notes and references

Bibliography
 
 "Stokes' trench howitzer, 3", mark I". US Army War College, January 1918. Made available online by Combined Arms Research Library
 Field Artillery Notes No. 7. US Army War College August 1917. Provided online by Combined Arms Research Library

External links

 "Handbook of the M.L. Stokes 3-Inch Trench Mortar Equipments. 1919." Published by His Majesty's Stationery Office, London, 1920.
 "Basic Field Manual. Volume III, Basic Weapons. Part Four, Howitzer Company. 3-inch Trench Mortar". United States War Department, 1932. Made available online by Combined Arms Research Library

Infantry mortars
World War I British infantry weapons
World War I mortars of the United Kingdom
World War I infantry weapons of Australia
World War II infantry weapons of Australia
81mm mortars
Weapons of the Philippine Army